"Every Woman in the World" is a song by British/Australian soft rock duo Air Supply. The song was written by Dominic Bugatti and Frank Musker. It was the third release from their fifth studio album, Lost in Love.

Reception
Billboard called it a "melodic midtempo tune filled with lyrical and instrumental hooks." Record World said that it has "honeyed harmonies" and "a heartwarming hook."

Personnel
Russell Hitchcock – vocals
Graham Russell – vocals, guitar

Chart performance
The song was most popular in the US, where it peaked at number five on the Billboard Hot 100 in 1981 and number two on the Adult Contemporary chart. Outside the US, it also reached number seven in New Zealand and number eight in Australia.

Weekly charts

Year-end charts

References

External links
 

1980 singles
Air Supply songs
1980 songs
Songs written by Frank Musker
Song recordings produced by Harry Maslin
Arista Records singles
1980s ballads
Songs written by Dominic Bugatti